Kutho was a well known Burmese director and comedian, active from 1990s to 2010s. He started as a comedian at anyeints before becoming a director in show business. He shot a video in which reputed actor Dwe impersonated as a woman. He opened a food shop when the show business was declined later. Other contemporary comedians were Po Phyu, Kyaw Htoo, Kin Kaung, Myittar and Zaganar.

His son, Ponna Kutho, is also in film business.

Dead
He died at Aung Yadanar Hospital in Yangon on 15 June 2014 at the age of 61.

References

20th-century Burmese male actors
Burmese comedians
2014 deaths
Burmese film directors
21st-century Burmese male actors
Burmese male film actors
Year of birth missing